Mean Mums is a New Zealand sitcom airing on Three, created by Amanda Alison. The series follows mothers at an upscale private school. A pilot for the series originally aired as part of Three's Comedy Pilot Week in 2018. It is broadcast in the United States on Peacock.

Cast
 Morgana O'Reilly as Jess
 Anna Jullienne as Heather Maloney
 Aroha Rawson as Hine
 Allan Henry as Principal Coxhead
 Sonny Tupu as Phil Right
 Bronwyn Bradley as Miss Love
 Goretti Chadwick as Margot
 Cori Gonzalez-Macuer as Freddy
 Eddie Waspe as Ryan
 Maddie Smith as Cinnamon
 Manu Powell as Braxton
 Pax Assadi as Dad

Series overview

References

External links
 
 

2010s New Zealand television series
2020s New Zealand television series
2019 New Zealand television series debuts
New Zealand television sitcoms
Television series by South Pacific Pictures
Television series by All3Media
Television shows funded by NZ on Air
Three (TV channel) original programming